Sheringham is the name of a preserved railway station in Sheringham, Norfolk. It was once part of the Midland and Great Northern Joint Railway network and closed in 1967 when a new station was opened by British Rail approx. 200m eastwards. Since 1975 it has served as the eastern terminus of the North Norfolk Railway. In March 2010, the link to Network Rail was reinstated.

History
The station was first opened on 16 June 1887 by the Eastern and Midlands Railway as part of the Cromer Branch linking the Norfolk Coast to the junction at Melton Constable railway station. In 1893 this was merged into the Midland and Great Northern Joint Railway Network. On 6 April 1964 in the wake of the Beeching Report, the line to Melton Constable was closed to passengers. Withdrawal of goods services from that line (as well as from Sheringham itself) followed on 28 December 1964. Sheringham station remained open for passengers until 2 January 1967, when it was closed upon the opening of a new station for passengers on the opposite side of Station Road, enabling the level crossing to be closed.

In 1975, the station was re-opened as part of the North Norfolk Railway, which runs along the old Cromer Branch route as far as Holt railway station. Another Sheringham railway station exists on the National Rail network, just across the road from the NNR station.

Connection to the National Rail network

Between 2007 and 2010, work was undertaken to reinstate the original level crossing across the road to allow trains from Norwich to run onto the North Norfolk Railway heritage line tracks. BBC Look East reported on 17 December 2007 that Network Rail supported the level crossing plans to allow occasional use for trains to cross between tracks. It was announced by the North Norfolk Railway on 16 December 2008, that work was going to start on the new level crossing in January 2009. These plans were later delayed until 2010 due to various problems, including: lack of funding, electricity cables needing to be moved, the county's highways department concerns with the implications of road closure to create the crossing.

Work began on 8 January 2010, with the moving of the NNR headshunt to slew into line with the Network Rail section. The link was reinstated on 11 March 2010, when the first passenger carrying train over the new crossing was steam locomotive ‘Oliver Cromwell’ hauling a train from London Liverpool Street. Occasional uses by charter trains and visiting rolling stock are anticipated to not exceed 12 times a year.

|-

References

Sheringham
Heritage railway stations in Norfolk
Former Midland and Great Northern Joint Railway stations
Railway stations in Great Britain opened in 1887
Railway stations in Great Britain closed in 1967
Railway stations in Great Britain opened in 1975